Celamodes is a monotypic moth genus in the family Erebidae erected by George Hampson in 1914. Its only species, Celamodes rufotincta, was first described by Walter Rothschild in 1912. It is found in New Guinea.

References

Nudariina
Monotypic moth genera
Taxa named by George Hampson
Moths described in 1912
Moths of Oceania